Kodi is a 2016 Indian Tamil-language political action drama film written and directed by R. S. Durai Senthilkumar and produced by Vetrimaaran under his banner Grass Root Film Company. The film stars Dhanush, Trisha and Anupama Parameswaran in the lead roles, while, Saranya Ponvannan, S. A. Chandrasekhar, Kaali Venkat, Namo Narayana, and G. Marimuthu play other key roles. Dhanush and Trisha pair up for the first time. Kodi, marks the Tamil debut of Anupama Parameshwaran.

Dhanush, who produced R. S. Durai Senthilkumar's previous two films, Ethir Neechal and Kakki Sattai, which stars Sivakarthikeyan in the lead role, played the male lead actor in this film. The film's music and background score were composed by Santhosh Narayanan, the cinematography is performed by Venkatesh S. The film was simultaneously dubbed in Telugu as Dharmayogi, which released one day after the Tamil version. Trisha won the Filmfare Critics Award for Best Actress – Tamil for her performance. The film was remade in Kannada as Dhwaja in 2018.

Plot 
Politics have been a part of Kodi's life ever since his birth in Pollachi. Kodi's father Murugan was a low-rung Democratic party worker, bringing him up in the world of politics before self-immolating in protest against a factory whose toxic mercury waste had ruined lives in the locality. Kodi's twin brother Anbu is the complete opposite of him – an engineering college professor and not political at all. Kodi grows up being political with his friend Bhagat, and is in a relationship with Rudra who, like Kodi, has been a politician all her life but with the opposing Republican party currently in power.

While fighting members of the opposition on the street one day, Kodi breaks a trolley of eggs that Malathi is trying to sell to a shopkeeper. She chases after him to no avail, before leaving for an appointment at a college cafeteria where she has an interview for a contract to sell eggs. She comes across Anbu, mistaking him for Kodi, before finding out about his twin brother. Anbu and Malathi fall in love. Later on, Malathi tells him about how the factories near her village dump all of their mercury waste where people live, impacting the lives of the villagers negatively. Anbu is worried and tells Kodi.

Meanwhile, Rudra is frustrated about being stereotyped as lower down in her party because she is a woman. She overhears that Arivazhagan, the State education minister from the Coimbatore district, actually dropped out of school and falsified his election nominations. She tips this information off to the Democratic party, who file a suit against the Minister. The Minister loses the case and is disqualified from his position, and the by-elections are announced for the Pollachi constituency. Rudra befriends the ex-minister, becomes the interim D.S, and then kicks him out.

The Democratic party are excited for the by-elections despite the Republicans winning for the last 25 years. Kodi meets his Party Supremo, who tells him that they will talk about the opposition's scandal but after the by-elections. Meanwhile, Anbu provides the documents about the mercury waste to Kodi, who then finds out that his ex-minister and party senior Marimuthu, and the entire Democratic party, are responsible for what happened to the villagers affected by the factory, as they were the ruling party at the time. Feeling betrayed, he shares this with Rudra in confidence, who brings it up at her next public speech.

Enraged and embarrassed, the Democratic leader plots to keep Kodi silent by announcing him as their by-election candidate – now running right against Rudra. When the Republican party finds out about Kodi and Rudra's relationship, they start pressuring her to give up her candidacy. A depressed Rudra asks Kodi to meet her in the woods to talk, and she tells him about the ex-minister standing in her way to success before she eliminated him. They get ambushed by goons that Arivazhagan sent to kill Rudra. Rudra suddenly stabs Kodi, apologises, and tells him that he was her last obstacle. Kodi is betrayed again but decides to die for her, and the by-elections are cancelled as they no longer have one of their candidates.

Rudra meets Kodi's family after the funeral and tells them that her party is willing to give Kodi's brother Anbu the position of MLA. Their mother declines it angrily, but Anbu accepts it and wins the by-election unopposed. Rudra is made the official District Secretary and an MP of Rajya Sabha. Anbu comes to congratulate her; his look and body language are now completely changed to match his brother Kodi's, much to Rudra's dismay. Anbu lets her know that he is very invested and interested in his brother's murder as well as the mercury waste issue.

Kotraivel, a member of the Democratic party, finds a forest camera hidden in the woods that recorded Rudra killing Kodi. He threatens Rudra with this, and tells her to fix the mercury waste issue. Rudra uses Crime Branch Inspector V. Ravichandran as a pawn to destroy the evidence and kill Kotraivel, but is still afraid of Anbu finding out about everything as he was taking the documents about the factory to the court.

In an attempt to stop him, Rudra kidnaps his mother and Bhagat, and tells Anbu to come to the factory. Anbu realises that Rudra killed Kodi and he gets in to a fight with Rudra's goons, Kotraivel and Marimuthu, resulting in Anbu winning. He came to the factory with the intention to kill Rudra, but his mother tells him that it is not worth it and to let her go. As they leave, Bhagat impales Rudra with an iron rod and tells her, he wished Rudra and Kodi to live happily but she spoiled it and to go and be with Kodi.

Cast

 Dhanush in a dual role as
Kodi, a local politician in the opposition party 
Anbu, a college lecturer, later Member of Legislative Assembly
 Trisha as Rudhra, a local politician in the ruling party, later a Member of Parliament, and Kodi's girlfriend  
 Anupama Parameswaran as Malathi, an egg seller and Anbu's love interest
 Saranya Ponvannan as Kodi and Anbu's mother
 S. A. Chandrasekhar as Thalaivar, President of Opposition party and Former CM
 Vijayakumar as Chief Minister of State, chairman of ruling 'Kudiyarasu Kazhagam'
 Sachu as Malathi's grandmother
 Kaali Venkat as Bhagat Singh, Kodi's close friend
 Namo Narayana as MLA Arivazhagan, Education Minister who forged certificate to pass in the exam and is disqualified from offices
 G. Marimuthu as Marimuthu, district secretary of the opposition party and former environment minister
 Karunas as Murugan, Kodi and Anbu's mute father who sets himself on fire while protesting against a factory
 Rajasimman as Kotraivel, Marimuthu's sidekick in the opposition party
 Anil Murali as Crime Branch Inspector V. Ravichandran, Pollachi North
 Raj Kapoor as Finance Minister of state and second-in-command of the ruling party
 Sruthi Shanmuga Priya as Malathi's sister
 Mohana as News Reporter
 Swaminathan as College Principal
 Singamuthu as Ruling Party MLA from Coimbatore
 Badava Gopi
 Sonia
 Baba Bhaskar in a special appearance in the song "Vettu Pottu"

Production
The project was first announced during August 2015, when Dhanush revealed that he would act in Durai Senthilkumar's next film, after he finished his ongoing commitments. Dhanush revealed that the film would be a political thriller and that he would appear in dual roles as two brothers. Shriya Saran was first selected as the heroine by Dhanush, but she couldn't allot dates for the film. Vidya Balan was then approached for the negative role in the film, but was not willing to do a Tamil film due to date issues. Trisha was signed as the female lead of the film. After unsuccessful negotiations with Lakshmi Menon and Rakul Preet Singh, who could not allot the dates, Shamili was signed on to portray the second leading female role. Shamili, however became unwell during the shoot of the film, and as a result of Dhanush's tight schedule, the makers chose to replace her. Madonna Sebastian was initially reported to have signed the film, before Anupama Parameswaran was confirmed as the second lead actress.
Initially scheduled to start shoot in early December 2015, plans were delayed as a result of the 2015 South India floods and the schedule was delayed by two weeks. Subsequently, the team held an official launch on 11 December 2015. Shooting started on 5 January 2016.

Release
The satellite rights of the film were sold to Sun TV.  The Television Premier was occurred on Thaipongal 2017. It was later dubbed and released in Hindi as Rowdy Hero 2 in 2017.

Reception
Srinivas Ramujan of The Hindu wrote 'Director Durai Senthilkumar  deserves credit for an engaging plot that includes a pre-interval block that jolts you. After all, when was the last time a commercial political film worked to a large extent without the existence of a dominating male villain?' India.com wrote 'Dhanush & Trisha Krishnan's film gets the BEST political thriller label' Manathi Mannath of The New Indian Express  concluded 'Kodi worth a watch for its universal sensibility'.

M Suganth of Times Of India gave Kodi 4 stars out of 5 and stated, 'Kodi shows how a good actor can make a film rise above its genre. Dhanush's performance here, subtly delineating the two roles, is a delight to watch. He shines in the mass hero moments as well as the dramatic ones. Sify stated 'Kodi is deliciously dramatic, and packed with sinister twists and turns with superb performances and solid writing' and rated 4 out of 5.

Press KS called it 'a political mass entertainer with an excellent performance by Dhanush and Trisha. Dhanush shines out and out with his dual role play. Commercial dialogues score high' giving 3.5/5. Latha Srinivasan of IB Times said 'Director Durai Senthilkumar and Dhanush have given a totally commercial film for the audience this Diwali. Watch the film for Dhanush's strong performance as Anbu and especially Kodi. This Diwali, this Kodi is set to fly high'. Bollywoodlife said 'Dhanush's double act is impressive but Trisha is the bigger surprise'.  Deccan Chronicle gave 3 out of 5 concluding 'Strong characterization and powerful cast makes it a winner.' Manoj Kumar R of The Indian Express gave 3 stars stating 'Kodi, which released on Diwali, seems to be everything the Tamil audience wants for this festive season'. Firstpost stated 'Kodi is a well written and packaged commercial entertainer that delivers the goods'.
Trisha (actress) won Filmfare Critics Award for Best Actress – Tamil for her performance and also received nominations for Dhanush in the Filmfare Award for Best Actor-Tamil, Vivek  for his lyrics in the song "en suzhali" in the category of Filmfare Award for Best Lyricist-Tamil, Saranya Ponvannan and Anupama Parameswaran are nominated for Filmfare Award for Best Supporting Actress-Tamil. The Telugu version Dharmayogi also received positive reviews and became a commercial success.

Box office
The film collected  in Tamil Nadu in two days. The film collected  in Tamil Nadu,  in Andhra Pradesh, Telangana, Karnataka and Kerala in first weekend.

Soundtrack
The soundtrack album for Kodi is composed by Santhosh Narayanan. The lyrics of four songs were penned by Vivek while Dhanush and Arunraja Kamaraj wrote and sung the song Kodi Parakkudha. The audio rights of the film were acquired by Sony Music India. The complete album was released on 5 October 2016 at Prasad Labs, Chennai. The album consists of five tracks.

Reception Sify gave a rating of 3 stars out of 5 and stated, "The ear-pleasing numbers make this a solid album". Behindwoods'' gave 2.75 stars out of 5 and stated "Kodi seems to be an apt composition for the film's subject"

References

External links
 

2010s Tamil-language films
2016 action drama films
2016 action thriller films
2010s political drama films
2010s political thriller films
Indian action drama films
Indian action thriller films
Indian political drama films
Indian political thriller films
Political action films
Films scored by Santhosh Narayanan
2016 films
Twins in Indian films
Films shot in Pollachi
Films about twin brothers
Indian films about revenge
Tamil films remade in other languages